Tabusintac is an unincorporated community in Northumberland County in the Canadian province of New Brunswick. It is situated on the north side of Miramichi Bay.

The name is also used by the local service district of Tabusintac.

History

Notable people

See also
List of communities in New Brunswick
Tabusintac 9 (Indian Reserve)

References

Communities in Northumberland County, New Brunswick
Designated places in New Brunswick
Local service districts of Northumberland County, New Brunswick